Ramón Clemente (born December 11, 1985) is a Puerto Rican professional basketball player for the Cangrejeros de Santurce of the Baloncesto Superior Nacional (BSN).

College career
Clemente started his college career at Paris Junior College in Paris, Texas playing for two years and winning back to back Conference Championships. In addition, he made the All American Team. 

After junior college, Clemente continued to play college basketball at Wichita State University in Kansas and graduated with a degree in Criminal Justice in 2009.

Professional career
Immediately after graduating college in 2009, Clemente played professionally in Puerto Rico with Mayaguez and continues to do so. In the 2009–10 season he joined Maccabi Ashdod B.C. from Israeli Liga Leumit.

Played for Hapoel Yokneam Megido from Israel  2010–2011.
Played for Maccabi Be'er Yaakov from Israel 2011–2012.
Played for Irony Nahariya from Israel 2012–2013.
Played in Italy from 2013–2014 and won a Championship. 
Currently playing for Obras Sanitarias from Argentina.

References

1985 births
Living people
2014 FIBA Basketball World Cup players
American expatriate basketball people in Argentina
American expatriate basketball people in Israel
American expatriate basketball people in Mexico
American men's basketball players
Astros de Jalisco players
Basketball players from New York City
Centers (basketball)
Ciclista Olímpico players
Ferro Carril Oeste basketball players
Halcones Rojos Veracruz players
Ironi Nahariya players
Leñadores de Durango players
Maccabi Ashdod B.C. players
Obras Sanitarias basketball players
Paris Dragons basketball players
Puerto Rican expatriate basketball people in Israel
Puerto Rican men's basketball players
San Lorenzo de Almagro (basketball) players
Sportspeople from Queens, New York
Wichita State Shockers men's basketball players
2019 FIBA Basketball World Cup players